I'd Like to See You Again is the fourth studio album by English post-punk band A Certain Ratio, released in 1982 by Factory Records.

The album spent twelve weeks in the UK Independent Chart, peaking at number 2.

Critical reception

I'd Like to See You Again received a mixed-to-favourable response from critics. Trouser Press wrote that the album "suffers from [singer Martha] Tilson's absence, and stumbles about, evincing self-consciousness and conservatism in place of the previously aggressive experimental attitude." Record Collector called it "one of their finest albums [...] I'd Like to See You Again is timeless, and ready for a first date with a new generation."

Track listing
Side one
 "Touch" – 5:05
 "Saturn" – 3:46
 "Hot Knights" – 3:51
 "I'd Like to See You Again" – 5:11

Side two
"Show Case" – 3:10
 "Sesamo Apriti - Corco Vada" – 3:51
 "Axis" – 6:25
 "Guess Who" – 4:58

Personnel
 Simon Topping
 Donald Johnson
 Jeremy Kerr
 Peter Terrell
 Martin Moscrop

References

External links
 

1982 albums
A Certain Ratio albums
Factory Records albums